Lorenzo Valeau (born 5 March 1999) is an Italian footballer who plays as a winger for Swiss club Chiasso.

Club career

Roma
He is a product of Roma youth teams and started playing for their Under-19 squad in the 2016–17 season.

He made several appearances for the senior squad in summer 2017 in pre-season friendlies.

Loan to Ascoli
On 18 July 2018 he joined Serie B club Ascoli on a season-long loan with an option to buy. Unfortunately, early in his loan term he suffered tibia fracture that took several months to heal. He was recalled from loan on 31 January 2019 without appearing on the field for Ascoli.

Loan to Catania
On 1 February 2019 he moved on another loan to Serie C club Catania.

He made his professional Serie C debut for Catania on 17 March 2019 in a game against Juve Stabia. He substituted Francesco Lodi in the 81st minute. He made his first (and only) starting lineup appearance on 3 April 2019 in a game against Viterbese. He finished his loan with 6 appearances.

Loan to Imolese
On 17 July 2019 he moved on another Serie C loan, to Imolese. He established himself as a starter for Imolese early in the season. He finished the loan with 31 appearances in all competitions.

Loan to Casertana
On 20 August 2020 he joined Casertana on loan, again in Serie C.

Loan to Fano
On 29 January 2021, he moved on loan to Fano.

Seregno
On 14 August 2021, he signed with Serie C club Seregno.

Chiasso
On 1 September 2022, Valeau joined Chiasso in the third-tier Swiss Promotion League.

International
He was first called up to represent his country in 2015 for Under-16 squad friendlies.

He subsequently appeared in friendlies on the Under-18, Under-19 and Under-20 level.

References

External links
 

1999 births
Living people
Footballers from Rome
Italian footballers
Italy youth international footballers
Association football defenders
Serie C players
Swiss Promotion League players
A.S. Roma players
Ascoli Calcio 1898 F.C. players
Catania S.S.D. players
Imolese Calcio 1919 players
Casertana F.C. players
Alma Juventus Fano 1906 players
U.S. 1913 Seregno Calcio players
FC Chiasso players
Italian expatriate footballers
Expatriate footballers in Switzerland
Italian expatriate sportspeople in Switzerland